Brother Blood is the name of two supervillains appearing in American comic books published by DC Comics. The first iteration, Sebastian Blood VIII, is a power-hungry priest and head of the Church of Blood, as well as the eighth person in the DC Universe to assume the mantle, after killing his father and taking the Brother Blood mantle from him. This tradition had gone on for generations, dating back to the 13th century, when the first Brother Blood was born after obtaining Christ's prayer shawl and gaining superhuman abilities. As Brother Blood, Sebastian served as a recurring adversary of the Teen Titans and archenemy of Cyborg, until being killed by his successor, Sebastian Blood IX.

A different iteration of Brother Blood appeared in the 2003 Teen Titans animated series, and its 2013 spin-off, Teen Titans Go!, voiced by John DiMaggio. Sebastian Blood was also a recurring character on the second season of The CW Arrowverse show Arrow, portrayed by Kevin Alejandro. Joseph Morgan appears as the character in the fourth season of the HBO Max series Titans.

Publication history
The first Brother Blood, Sebastian Blood VIII, debuted in The New Teen Titans #21 (July 1982), created by writer Marv Wolfman and artist George Pérez. He was a regular foe of the Teen Titans for many years.

The second Brother Blood, Sebastian Blood IX, debuted in Outsiders vol. 3 #6 (January 2004), created by writer Judd Winick and artist ChrisCross.

Fictional character biography

Sebastian Blood VIII
The first Brother Blood encountered by the Titans was the eighth to bear the title. Seven hundred years earlier, a priest in the fictional nation of Zandia named Brother Sebastian killed another priest to gain possession of what he believed to be Christ's prayer shawl. The shawl gave him invulnerability and reduced his aging, but the priest he killed cursed him to be slain by his son before his hundredth birthday. Upon doing so, his son became the second Brother Blood. He, in turn was killed by his son, and this continued for seven centuries.

The eighth Brother Blood is, seemingly, the first who wishes to extend the Church of Blood beyond Zandia. He wants the Church to be a world power. The Church of Blood began operating in America, and the Titans were called to investigate when an ex-girlfriend of Cyborg attempted to escape this cult. Because of the Church of Blood's influence, the Titans found moving against him difficult, especially when public opinion was turned against them by Bethany Snow, a reporter who was also a member of the Church.

Brother Blood brainwashed Nightwing and attempted to take control of Raven's power. She defeated him, and his mind was seemingly destroyed. Brother Blood's wife Mother Mayhem later birthed a girl, suggesting the curse was over.

Sebastian Blood IX

Some time later, in Outsiders vol. 3, Brother Blood returned to villainy. Shortly after recreating his cult, he was killed by a young boy, Sebastian, claiming to be the new Brother Blood. This version reappeared in Teen Titans vol. 3.

This teenaged Brother Blood seemingly based all his decisions on advice from Mother Mayhem, but this was actually a female cultist chosen at random and killed if the advice was not what he wanted to hear. He also exhibited vampiric abilities. He revealed that the Cult of Blood was based on the worship of Trigon. It was for this reason that the new Bride of Blood was to be Raven. The Titans were able to save Raven, but the Church of Blood continued.

Brother Blood later appeared during the "Infinite Crisis" storyline as a member of Alexander Luthor Jr.'s Secret Society of Super Villains, where he claimed an undead Lilith Clay to be his mother. He also summoned the first Hawk and Dove, Phantasm, Kole, and Aquagirl from the dead to be his own Teen Titans. Brother Blood was stopped by Kid Eternity and sent to the eighth level of Hell, but not before Kid Eternity summoned the past Brother Bloods, all of whom took out their anger and hatred on Sebastian.

In the aftermath of the "Reign In Hell" miniseries, Blood, now an adult, escaped from his incarceration and was opposed by Kid Eternity. The fight between the two brought them to Titans Tower, where Blood fought the Titans. After draining Red Devil's powers, Blood realized that he had tainted himself with Neron's influence and fled the battle. He was later seen approaching an unknown woman, looking to make her his new mother.

Sometime later, the Secret Six was hired to infiltrate one of Blood's cults and rescue a wealthy teenager who had been forced into the group against his will. After the team's cover was blown, they proceeded to kill a number of the church's members and ultimately destroyed their compound.

The New 52
In September 2011, The New 52 rebooted DC's continuity. In this new timeline, The Cult of Blood (once again as Trigon's pawns) makes their debut in issue one of the Phantom Stranger. Brother Blood himself appears in Ravagers. Blood kidnaps the team intending to use Beast Boy's powers in a ritual to travel in The Red's dimension. The Ravagers manage to interrupt the ritual as Terra buries him alive. He survives and returns in Animal Man, where it is revealed his obsession with the Red came from being their first option for champion before Buddy Baker was chosen.

Mother Blood
In 2016, DC Comics implemented another relaunch of its books called "DC Rebirth", which restored its continuity to a form much as it was prior to the New 52. Sonya Tarinka is a woman who has a deep connection to The Red, as well as the previous leader. As Mother Blood, she is shown to have the power of mind control as she mind-controlled Beast Boy.

Powers and abilities
The first Blood is a formidable opponent who is backed by a massive number of fanatical followers. He is an expert manipulator who feeds off of the faith of his members. He ages at a much slower rate than normal humans. Brother Blood is immune to Raven's soul-self due to his shawl's powers. He is also nigh invulnerable and has supernatural physical strength.

The second Blood's powers work in a manner similar to those of a vampire: he gains strength from blood, and can take on the abilities of anyone whose blood he has sampled. Like the first Blood, he is backed by a massive number of fanatical followers.

Other versions

Smallville
Brother Blood is featured in the Smallville Season 11 digital comic based on the TV series. In the story-arc "Harbinger", Blood and his cult plan to sacrifice teenager Rachel Roth but thwarted by John Constantine and Zatanna.

Flashpoint
In the alternate timeline of the Flashpoint event, Brother Blood is mentioned by his former student Jason Todd as being a developing drug lord.

In other media

Television

Animation

 Brother Blood appears as the main antagonist in the third season of Teen Titans, voiced by John DiMaggio. This version is the charismatic and sadistic Headmaster of the H.I.V.E. Academy, and archenemy of Cyborg. His powers are very different from his comic book incarnation, and include mind control, teleportation, telekinesis, energy shield creation, and photographic memory. Blood and his army of hooded Cyborg copies attacked the Titans East Tower in Steel City in part one of "Titans East", successfully brainwashing the team. In part two, Blood gained cybernetics based on Cyborg's stolen blueprints to be a better match for him, but is ultimately defeated by Cyborg and the Titans. 
 When talking about the series' incarnation of Brother Blood, producer/writer David Slack said: "In the end, we tried to make him the anti-Slade. Where Slade hides in the shadows, Brother Blood loves the spotlight. Slade always has some ulterior motive, Brother Blood will tell you what he's planning right away. So there's some contrast there. We weren't even sure we'd get to use that name. I think what was important that we kept was that he was the leader of a cult. We kept that role and drew inspiration from cult leaders we read about. They are very charming seeming people. From that, we gave him this sort of 'power of temptation' – this ability to control people's perceptions. And the power of persuasion. We didn't get too deep into the character from the comics, because so much of it was so outside of what we'd be able to do. He's definitely one where we've strayed more".
 Brother Blood is a recurring villain in Teen Titans Go!, voiced again by John DiMaggio. He is introduced in the episode "Waffles" alongside his creation, a torture robot called Pain Bot (voiced by Scott Menville) which can only say "Pain" and "All I know is pain".

Live-action
 Brother Blood appears in Arrow season 2, portrayed by Kevin Alejandro. Born in the worst section of Starling City known as the Glades, Blood's father, Sebastian Sangre, was an abusive alcoholic who would often beat Sebastian and his submissive mother, Maya Resik. By day, Sebastian Blood is a charismatic former alderman and mayoral candidate for Starling City, and a personal friend to Oliver Queen aka The Arrow after Oliver helped rebuild the Glades. By night he is the leader of the "Church of Blood", inherited from a man named Father Roger Trigon, under the name "Brother Blood". Blood is a very motivated political speaker who is not afraid to take life-threatening risks for the people of Starling, but as Brother Blood he wears a skull mask with a voice modifier, operating mostly in secret. Blood kidnaps criminals and injects them with a serum called Mirakuru, accidentally killing Xavier Reed and Max Stanton, before making his first successful injection with Cyrus Gold, who gains super strength. Blood is revealed to be in alliance with Slade Wilson, with Slade backing Blood's own campaign for mayor, but after the death of his campaign rival Moira Queen, Blood learned that Slade intended to completely destroy Starling City, when Blood had been told that it would just be badly damaged so that Blood could rebuild. Blood attempted to betray his former partners by giving Oliver Queen vital information in exchange for leniency, but he was killed by Slade's ally Isabel Rochev after providing Oliver with samples of Mirakuru so that Oliver could refine the cure.
 Brother Blood appears in season 4 of Titans, portrayed by Joseph Morgan. This version goes by the name of Sebastian Sanger, a Metropolis taxidermist who starts to see hallucinations of blood and hearing chanting. His backstory is that of a orphan but is revealed to be a son of Trigon, as his birth mother "Mother Mayhem" was once his bride, thus making him and Raven half-siblings.

Film
 Brother Blood appears as the main antagonist in Teen Titans: The Judas Contract, voiced by Gregg Henry. This version is the leader of H.I.V.E., a cult seeking divine dominion over mankind. Blood claims to be hundreds of years old, attributing his long lifespan to his practice of bathing in the blood of his enemies. Blood has Deathstroke and Terra kidnap most of the Teen Titans to drain their powers and thus make himself into a god-like being. However, the plan is thwarted by Nightwing and an enraged Terra, who was betrayed by Deathstroke. In the end, Blood is depowered by Raven and slain by his aide Mother Mayhem to prevent him from being imprisoned. Their bodies are subsequently crushed by debris when Terra causes the H.I.V.E. temple to collapse.

Video games
 Brother Blood appears as a boss in the Game Boy Advance version of the game based on the show, voiced again by John DiMaggio.
 Brother Blood appears in DC Universe Online, voiced by Ev Lunning. He and his cult attempt to bring Trigon to Earth by raising the demons of the Seven Deadly Sins, but are defeated by the players and the Sentinels of Magic.

Miscellaneous
 In the tie-in comic to Arrow, Season 2.5, issue #2, Brother Blood is shown to be alive and leading his newly founded Church of Blood. In the next issue, Clinton Hogue (portrayed by Roark Critchlow in Arrow live-action), Sebastian's aid, has taken up his moniker and is the man under the skull mask. Hogue is a devout theologian and humbly serves an unnamed deity. When Sebastian was murdered, he took his mantle. Hogue is connected with a mercenary group in Bludhaven called the Renegades and has a profiler draw up sketches of the two people responsible for his capture and interrogation, John Diggle and Felicity Smoak. He holds Felicity captive, but Oliver rescues her and Roy Harper kicks Hogue off of the building they are on, causing him to fall to his death.
 The tie-in novel to Arrow called Arrow: Vengeance explores his backstory: Sebastian was a young man who was born and raised in the crime-riddled neighborhood known as the Glades. His father, Sebastian Sangre, was abusive to him and his mother that he would frequently have nightmares, envisioning him in the image of a skull. Sebastian befriended to a teenager named Cyrus Gold and his mentor Roger Trigon. One day, his father came home estranged and threatened to kill him, but Gold and Trigon (disguised as the Acolyte and the Devil) broke in and beat him. Trigon suggested to Sebastian to take father's gun and kill him which he did. His mother Maya Resik received the blame for her husband's death, arrested and put in psychiatric institution. When Sebastian was received in Zandia Orphanage, he met with Gold, now a preacher, and saw him as an older brother-like figure. He created a skull mask to conquer own fears about nightmares of his father. The mask was placed upon him by Trigon in a ceremony, where Sebastian officially became a member of the Church of Blood as Brother Blood, swearing to protect the poorest of the city and the orphans of Zandia, regardless of the cost. He later met with mercenary Slade Wilson/Deathstroke who offered him to become a mayor of Starling City.

References

External links
 DCU Guide: Brother Blood II-VII
 DCU Guide: Brother Blood IX

Green Arrow characters
Comics characters introduced in 1982
DC Comics martial artists
DC Comics metahumans
DC Comics male supervillains
DC Comics characters who can move at superhuman speeds
DC Comics characters who can teleport
DC Comics characters who have mental powers
DC Comics characters who use magic
DC Comics characters with superhuman strength
DC Comics telekinetics
DC Comics telepaths
DC Comics vampires
DC Comics cyborgs
DC Comics titles
Fictional hypnotists and indoctrinators
Fictional Satanists
Fictional characters with energy-manipulation abilities
Fictional characters with eidetic memory
Fictional cult leaders
Characters created by Marv Wolfman
Characters created by George Pérez
DC Comics television characters